Jocotepec  is a town and municipality, in Jalisco in central-western Mexico. The municipality covers an area of 384.36 km². As of 2005, the municipality had a total population of 37,972.

History
Perhaps as early as 100 BC, nomadic bands of Indians passed through the Lake Chapala Valley. Some moved on, others settled on the shore. Jocotepec, once Xuxutepeque, a small fishing village at the western end of the Lake, became a permanent home for the Nahua Indians in 1361. They built a temple to their god, Iztlacateotl, and practiced human sacrifice. The village became a trading and ceremonial site for the surrounding mountain area.

"Xuxutepeque was the name given Jocotepec by its first Nahua settlers. (The last of the nomadic bands to settle in this area were the Purépecha.) It became a permanent home for the Nahuas in 1361. Xuxutepeque later became "Xilotepec", meaning "Hill of ear of Corn". Finally, with the arrival of the Spaniards, led by Jacob Tepec, the settlement's name became "Jocotepec" and was interpreted as meaning "Hill of Guavas". (Guavas are a small bitter-sweet tasting fruit.) The meaning of Jocotepec is thus derived: Xoco-tepe-K, meaning Xoco (fruit); Tepetl (hill); and K (place)."

In 1520, Captain Alonzo de Avalos was given this area as an encomienda (land grant). Chief Xitomatl, who then governed the area between Chapala, Jalisco and Jocotepec, submitted his territory to Spanish rule without a battle. In 1529, Jocotepec was formally founded, according to a title of property issued by Hernán Cortés, a copy of which can be found today in Jocotepec records.

Franciscan fathers then proceeded with conversion of the natives. Old Indian temples were destroyed and Catholic church foundations laid in their ruins. At that time, Jocotepec acquired its two religious protectors - Nuestro Senor del Monte and Nuestro Senor del Guaje.

The municipality of Jocotepec has a large variety of trees and plants, mostly located inside garden walls. The main plaza is surrounded by greenery, making it very inviting.

Vegetation is composed mainly of jacaranda, galeana, hule, pine, roble, cazuarina, mesquite, guamuchil, chaparrale and encino. Fruit trees such as mango, avocado, lime, lemon and orange are also abundant.

In North Jocotepec, acacia, huizache and palo-bobos predominate, while in the south (lake) side, there are a few sauce trees and sabinos. A large farm grows raspberries for export. Fields of corn and chayote are very common in this area.

Products of Jocotepec are mainly wool carpets in typical weaves and many colors, and the traditional serapes of this village. Another important industry is the fabrication of tiles, ready-made or made to the client's design. Wood and forged iron furniture can also be made to order. A large sweater factory is expected to soon start exporting. Recently, painting and music have been given a boost by local organizations promoting cultural events.

Jocotepec has two religious protectors: Nuestro Senor del Monte and Nuestro Senor del Guaje. A Fiesta Patronal (a religious celebration of these protectors) is held early in January. It lasts two weeks, and honors the first patron, the Lord of the Mountain, with daily masses, dances, cockfights, bullfights, parades and fireworks. Another fiesta, later in the year, honors Nuestro Senor del Guaje, but on a smaller scale.

The town has several sport recreation centers, 2 banks, and 2 gas stations.

Government

Municipal presidents

Notable people 
María Guadalupe Urzúa Flores (1912 – 2004), Municipal President of Jocotepec, from 1983 to 1985.

References

External links
 Fotos of Jocotepec

Municipalities of Jalisco